The architecture of New Zealand, though influenced by various cultures, expresses pre-dominantly European styles. Polynesian influences emerge in some areas.

Architectural education 
Victoria University of Wellington, Unitec, ARA Institute, Auckland University of Technology (AUT) and the University of Auckland train future architects.

Regional styles and building materials

Many of the more imposing structures in and around Dunedin and Christchurch were built in the latter part of the 19th century as a result of the economic boom following the Central Otago Gold Rush. A common style for these landmarks is the use of dark basalt blocks and facings of cream-coloured Oamaru stone, a form of limestone mined at Weston in North Otago. Notable buildings in this style include Dunedin Railway Station, the University of Otago Registry Building, Christchurch Arts Centre, Knox Church, Dunedin, ChristChurch Cathedral, Christchurch, Christ's College, Christchurch, Garrison Hall, Dunedin, parts of the Canterbury Provincial Council Buildings and Otago Boys' High School. Several more recent buildings have mimicked this style by using brick in place of basalt, but using lighter stone facings in an identical style to the older structures. Notable among these buildings are Otago Girls' High School and the Timaru Basilica. This region was able to call upon the talents of many fine architects during this period, among them Robert Lawson, Francis Petre, Benjamin Mountfort, and George Troup.

Oamaru stone, despite its susceptibility to the elements, is used as a major construction material on several fine buildings, most obviously in the town of Oamaru itself. The historic sector of this town contains numerous fine buildings built in this creamy stone, among them the Forrester Gallery and Waitaki District Council building. Waitaki Boys' High School is also a prime example of the use of Oamaru stone architecture.

Sustainable building

Architecture in national crises
Napier and Christchurch have suffered damage to numerous heritage buildings as a result of earthquakes. Napier was rebuilt after a 1931 earthquake in an Art Deco style, which was popular at that time. The Otago town of Ranfurly, which expanded during the 1930s, is also noted for its Art Deco architecture. The 2010 and 2011 earthquakes damaged many buildings and sceneries in Christchurch as well as the Canterbury region.

Organisations
New Zealand Registered Architects Board is a statutory board that assesses, registers and monitors architects in New Zealand. 
New Zealand Institute of Architects is a professional organisation that promotes architects and provides services to its membership. Not all New Zealand architects are members of the NZIA. Members pay an annual subscription.
Wellington Architectural Centre
SAHANZ (Society of Architectural Historians, Australia and New Zealand)
Heritage New Zealand, a non-profit autonomous Crown entity, was set up through the Historic Places Act 1954 as the New Zealand Historic Places Trust to protect New Zealand's historical and cultural heritage including notable buildings.

Gallery

See also

List of New Zealand architects
Housing in New Zealand
Culture of New Zealand

References

External links
New Zealand Registered Architects Board (NZRAB)
Register of New Zealand Architects
New Zealand Institute of Architects